The Toronto Maple Leafs are a team of the Intercounty Baseball League, based in Toronto, Ontario. They play their home games on "Dominico Field" at Christie Pits. They are also known colloquially as the Intercounty Maple Leafs or the Intercounty Leafs to disambiguate themselves from the Toronto Maple Leafs hockey team.

Home games usually take place on Wednesday evenings and Sunday afternoons, and are free for the public to attend. The games are popular with people in the neighbourhood, who enjoy the warm weather, picturesque setting, and of course the baseball game itself. Hotdogs are sold behind the outfield fence and Alan "Al" Ross sells raffle tickets to raise money to support the team.

History
The Maple Leafs baseball team began to play in 1969, the second season after the original Toronto Maple Leafs baseball team of the AAA International League moved to Louisville, Kentucky.

In their inaugural year, the new Leafs lost 23 games, finishing 18 games out of first place. But they have never ended a season that far back since then. They have been in first place 19 times in the subsequent years and have the best winning percentage of any active team in the League.

The team was owned by husband and wife Jack and Lynne Dominico for the first 40 years of its existence and was then owned exclusively by Jack after Lynne's passing on November 8, 2008, until his passing on January 12, 2022. The Intercounty Baseball League Championship is also named in their honour, the Jack and Lynne Dominico Trophy.

Championships
Since its inception, the team has won the Jack and Lynne Dominico Trophy as Intercounty Baseball champions eight times, the first in 1972. During the 2002 season, the Leafs were undefeated at home, a first for the league. They also won the championship that year. They have also achieved many individual awards and All-Star nominations.

Championships (8): 1972, 1982, 1985, 1988, 1995, 1999, 2002, 2007

Former players

Former Major League Baseball player Pete Orr once played for the Intercounty Leafs as did former Toronto Blue Jays outfielder Rich Butler (2001–2002).  Rich's brother, Rob Butler, who was also a former Toronto Blue Jays outfielder, also played with the Leafs (2001–2005), as did former Toronto Blue Jays pitcher Paul Spoljaric (2002–2007). Chris Leroux (2009–2014, Dustin Richardson (2009–2010), and Angel Castro (2015) round out ex-big-leaguers that have played for the Leafs.

Front office

 Damon Topolie (VP of Baseball Operations & General Manager)
 Garrett Takamatsu (field manager)
 Roger Lajoie (VP of Business Operartions)
 Ryan Eakin (Director of Communications and Game-Day Operations)

Current roster

SP Angel Castro
SP Zach Sloan
SP Marek Deska
SP Sebastian Kahn
SP Diego Dominguez 
RP Dustin Richardson
RP Franklin Hernandez
RP Dylan Jacober
RP Chris Nagorski
RP Sam Greene
RP Ryan Wells
RP Adam Marra
RP Rhys Montgomery
C Justin Marra
C Brady Cerkowynk 
1B Jordan Castaldo 
1B Damon Topolie 
2B Garrett Takamatsu
2B Dan Marra
SS Jose Vinicio 
3B Johnathan Solazzo
INF Aiden Mcaskie 
INF Blake Simpson 
INF Nikko Khannisho 
OF Greg Carrington 
OF Connor Lewis
OF Marcus Knecht
OF Grant Tamane
OF Ryan Santos 
OF Luca Boscarino 
OF Glenn Noronha 
OF Dawson Parks

References

External links
 

Map
Intercounty Baseball League
Baseball teams established in 1969
Baseball teams in Ontario
1969 establishments in Ontario